"Business" is a song by American rapper Eminem from his fourth studio album The Eminem Show (2002). "Business" was released as the final single from the album on July 22, 2003, but it was not released as an official single in the United States.

Composition & reception
"Business" is a hip hop song of four minutes and eleven seconds in length. It sees Eminem comparing himself and Dr. Dre, the song's producer, to fictional crime-fighting duo Batman and Robin, a comparison first explored in the music video for the previous Eminem single "Without Me". The lyrics are backed by a "cartoonish" beat: one of several Dr. Dre productions on The Eminem Show which, according to CultureDose writer Marty Brown, affords Eminem a "perfect sound-scape" to inspire emotions in the listener, calling the beat "a launchpad equally effective for humor or anger". Writing for Pitchfork Media, Ethan P. noted the "cartoonish" production to be similar in style to several of Eminem's early singles, claiming it to be fitting to the Batman and Robin theme on "Business", but noted that "this time he's actually talking about Batman and Robin!!". DX Magazine editor J-23 called this "classic" with Dre beats. Kris Ex On "Business": "Em names himself the gatekeeper of hip-hop and obliquely claims to be the best rapper alive: 'The flow's too wet/Nobody close to it/Nobody says it, but everybody knows the shit.'"

Track listing
UK CD1

UK CD2

UK Cassette

German CD single

Australian CD single

German 3" CD single

The Singles version

Charts

Weekly charts

Year-end charts

Certifications

In popular culture
The song was used in the 2022 San Diego Comic-Con trailer of the film Shazam! Fury of the Gods.

References

Eminem songs
2003 singles
Song recordings produced by Dr. Dre
Songs written by Eminem
Shady Records singles
Aftermath Entertainment singles
Interscope Records singles
Comedy rap songs
Songs written by Dr. Dre
Songs written by Theron Feemster
Songs written by Mike Elizondo